The Way Ahead (also known as Immortal Battalion) (1944) is a British Second World War drama film directed by Carol Reed. The screenplay was written by Eric Ambler and Peter Ustinov. The film stars David Niven, Stanley Holloway and William Hartnell along with an ensemble cast of other British actors, including Ustinov in one of his earliest roles. The Way Ahead follows a group of civilians who are conscripted into the British Army and, after training, are shipped to North Africa where they are involved in a battle against the Afrika Korps.

Plot
In the days after the Dunkirk evacuation in the Second World War, recently commissioned Second Lieutenant Jim Perry (Niven), a pre-war Territorial private soldier, is posted to the (fictional) Duke of Glendon's Light Infantry, known as the "Dogs", to train replacements to fill its depleted ranks. He is joined by Sergeant Ned Fletcher (Hartnell), a veteran of the British Expeditionary Force.

In contrast to Perry, the rest of the squad is shocked to have been conscripted to the army. Evan Lloyd, an unscrupulous rent collector, Sid Beck (Leslie Dwyer), a travel agent, Geoffrey Stainer (Jimmy Hanley), a friend of Lloyd's, Ted Brewer (Stanley Holloway), a plumber working in parliament, Herbert Davenport (Raymond Huntley), a department store manager with his young employee Bill Parsons (Hugh Burden) and finally Scottish farm labourer Luke (John Laurie).

A patient, mild-mannered officer, Perry does his strenuous best to turn the bunch of grumbling ex-civilians into soldiers, earning himself their intense dislike. The conscripts also mistakenly believe that their drill sergeant Fletcher is treating them harshly due to a minor incident where Lloyd spilt tea on the older man. Lloyd decides to air this grievance with Perry by reporting Fletcher for being unfair to the squad. When Perry approaches Fletcher over Lloyd's accusation, Fletcher in fact discloses that he is pleased with the way they are developing and even goes so far to state that a few of the men (including Lloyd) could be future NCOs.

When Parsons appears to desert his post, Perry takes a kindly stance with the young man and learns that his wife is being threatened by debt collectors. Perry speaks up for the young man at his court martial and he is allowed rejoin the unit. The other men go on a training exercise and to "avenge" Perry's treatment of Parsons they sabotage the war game bringing shame on the battalion. Perry angrily rebukes the men who afterwards learn that Parsons was saved by Perry. Eventually the men come to respect both sergeant Fletcher and Perry.

After completing their training, the battalion is transferred to North Africa to face Rommel's Afrika Korps, but their troopship is torpedoed en route and they are forced to abandon ship. When Sergeant Fletcher is trapped below deck by a burning vehicle, both Perry and Private Luke (John Laurie) intervene and work to save him. The survivors are evacuated to a nearby destroyer and are taken to Gibraltar, missing the invasion entirely.

When they eventually arrive in North Africa, the platoon is assigned to guard a small town. Perry appropriates a cafe as his headquarters, much to the disgust of the pacifist owner, Rispoli (Peter Ustinov). He instructs the men to respect the cafe owner and the men form a bond after playing darts and allowing Rispoli to join in. When the Germans attack, Perry and his men fiercely defend their positions, aided by Rispoli.

As the battle seems to turn, the Germans approach the British position under a white flag and invite Perry to surrender to save his men. Perry through his interpreter Beck tell the Germans to "Go to Hell!". The besieged British soldiers fix bayonets and join other surviving units in advancing on the enemy, hidden in the smoke from explosions. The film ends with two veteran "Dogs" appreciatively reading about the men's bravery.

Cast

Platoon
 David Niven as Lieutenant Jim Perry
 William Hartnell as Sergeant Ned Fletcher (credited as Billy Hartnell)
 Hugh Burden as Private Bill Parsons
 James Donald as Private, later Corporal, Evan Lloyd
 Leslie Dwyer as Private Sid Beck
 Jimmy Hanley as Private Geoffrey Stainer (credited as Jimmie Hanley)
 Stanley Holloway as Private Ted Brewer
 Raymond Huntley as Private Herbert Davenport
 John Laurie as Private Luke

Wives
 Penelope Dudley-Ward as Mrs Jim Perry (credited as Penelope Ward)
 Grace Arnold as Mrs Ned Fletcher
 Esma Cannon as Mrs Ted Brewer
 Eileen Erskine as Mrs Bill Parsons

Others
 Peter Ustinov as Rispoli, cafe owner
 Reginald Tate as the Training Company Commanding Officer
 Leo Genn as Captain Edwards
 Renée Asherson as Marjorie Gillingham (credited as Renee Ascherson)
 Mary Jerrold as Mrs Gillingham
 Jack Watling as Sergeant Buster
 Raymond Lovell as Mr Jackson
 A. E. Matthews as Colonel Walmsley
 Lloyd Pearson as Sam Thyrtle
 John Ruddock as Old Chelsea Soldier
 A. Bromley Davenport as Old Chelsea Soldier (credited as Bromley Davenport)
 Tessie O'Shea as Herself
 Trevor Howard as Ship's Officer (uncredited)
 George Merritt as the Sergeant-Major (uncredited)
 Tracy Reed as the Perrys' Daughter (uncredited)

 Frank Denis Broadhurst (uncredited)

Production
The Way Ahead was written by Eric Ambler and Peter Ustinov, and directed by Carol Reed. The three had originally produced the 1943 44-minute training film The New Lot, which was produced for the Army Kinematograph Service. The Way Ahead was an expanded remake of their earlier film, this time intended for a commercial audience. The two films featured some of the same actors, including John Laurie, Raymond Huntley and a 23-year-old Peter Ustinov.

The driving force behind the film was David Niven, a 1930 graduate of Sandhurst, who at the time was a major in the British Army working with the Army Film Unit and later served in Normandy with GHQ Liaison Regiment. Niven was the executive producer on The Way Ahead.

The last scene in The Way Ahead shows the soldiers advancing in a counter-attack. Instead of the film ending with the words "The End", it concludes with "The Beginning". In a film made and released during the war, this was an effort to galvanise public support for the final push in the war effort, with a perhaps not unintended reference to one of Winston Churchill's famous quotations: "This is not the end. It is not even the beginning of the end. But it is, perhaps, the end of the beginning."

In the United States, an edited version of The Way Ahead, with an introduction by journalist Quentin Reynolds, was released as Immortal Battalion.

Reception
According to trade papers, The Way Ahead was a success at the British box office in 1944. According to Kinematograph Weekly the 'biggest winners' at the box office in 1944 Britain were For Whom the Bell Tolls, This Happy Breed, Song of Bernadette, Going My Way, This Is the Army, Jane Eyre, The Story of Dr Wassell, Cover Girl, White Cliffs of Dover, Sweet Rosie O'Grady and Fanny By Gaslight. The biggest British hits of the year were, in order, Breed, Fanny By Gaslight, The Way Ahead and Love Story.

In 1945, The Way Ahead (referred to as Immortal Battalion) was listed as one of the Top Ten Films by the USA National Board of Review.

As Immortal Battalion, film critic and historian Leonard Maltin noted: "Exhilarating wartime British film showing how disparate civilians come to work together as a fighting unit; full of spirit and charm, with an outstanding cast, and fine script by Eric Ambler and Peter Ustinov."

The final scene of the advancing soldiers was imitated for the closing credits of the long-running BBC sitcom Dad's Army. John Laurie appeared in both productions and his performance in the sitcom credits replicates this film.

References

Notes

Citations

Bibliography

 Evans, Alun. Brassey's Guide to War Films. Dulles, Virginia: Potomac Books, 2000. .
 Howe, David J., Mark Stammers and Stephen James Walker. The Handbook: The First Doctor — The William Hartnell Years 1963–1966. London: Virgin Books, 1994. .
 Morgan-Russell, Simon. Jimmy Perry and David Croft. Manchester, UK: Manchester University Press, 2004. .
 Murphy, Robert. Realism and Tinsel: Cinema and Society in Britain 1939–48. London: Routledge, 2003. .
 Pertwee, Bill. Dad's Army: The Making of a Television Legend. London: Conway, 2009..

External links
 
 
 
 The Way Ahead at screenonline
 Film review at Variety

1944 films
1940s war drama films
British war drama films
British black-and-white films
World War II films made in wartime
Two Cities Films films
Films directed by Carol Reed
North African campaign films
Films scored by William Alwyn
1944 drama films
1940s English-language films
1940s British films